Pentas lanceolata, commonly known as Egyptian starcluster, is a species of flowering plant in the madder family, Rubiaceae that is native to much of Africa as well as Yemen. It is known for its wide use as a garden plant where it often accompanies butterfly gardens.

References

lanceolata
Plants described in 1775
Flora of the Democratic Republic of the Congo
Flora of Djibouti
Flora of Eritrea
Flora of Ethiopia
Flora of Kenya
Flora of Malawi
Flora of Mozambique
Flora of Sudan
Flora of Rwanda
Flora of Tanzania
Flora of Uganda
Flora of Yemen